Jean-Louis Allibert (1897–1979) was a French film and television actor. He is sometimes also known as Louis Allibert.

Selected filmography
 Monte Carlo (1925)
 The Painter and His Model (1925)
 Saint Joan the Maid (1929)
 Le Million (1931)
 Alone (1931)
 The Three Musketeers (1932)
 The Blaireau Case (1932)
 Youth (1933)
 Light Cavalry (1935)
 Prince Charming (1942)
 At Your Command, Madame (1942)
 The Queen's Necklace (1946)
 Criminal Brigade (1947)

References

Bibliography
 Gmür, Leonhard. Rex Ingram: Hollywood's Rebel of the Silver Screen. Impressum, 2013.

External links

1897 births
1979 deaths
French male film actors
French male silent film actors
20th-century French male actors
Male actors from Paris